The Andalusian Progress Party (in Spanish: Partido Andaluz del Progreso; PAP) was an Andalusian nationalist political party in Andalusia, founded in 1993 by Pedro Pacheco (then mayor of Jérez de la Frontera), as the result of a split in the Andalusian Party (PA) due to the confrontation between Alejandro Rojas-Marcos and Pacheco himself, who it ended with the departure of him and his supporters from the party.

History
After the split, the PAP had four of the ten former deputies in the Parliament of Andalusia and several mayors of the PA. In the general elections of 1993 the party gained 43,169 votes and no representation, while in the Andalusian elections of 1994 the party joined a coalition with the PA called Andalusian Coalition–Andalusian Power. The coalition gained 3 seats. In 1996 PAP joined the PA again.

References

El liderazgo político en el partido andalucista (PA), Enrique G. Pérez Nieto (UAL). VII Congreso Español de Ciencia política y de la Administración: Democracia y Buen Gobierno.

1993 establishments in Spain
1996 disestablishments in Spain
Andalusian nationalist parties
Defunct nationalist parties in Spain
Defunct social democratic parties in Spain
Left-wing nationalist parties
Political parties disestablished in 1996
Political parties established in 1996
Political parties in Andalusia